The Association of Arab Universities (Arabic: إتحاد الجامعات العربية), also called the Union of Arab Universities (Arabic: تحاد الجامعات العربية), is an organization working within the framework of the Arab League. It is based in Amman, Jordan. The objective of the organization is to support and connect universities in the Arab world, and to enhance cooperation among them.

Members
Universities that are members (280) in the AARU are from the following 22 countries:

See also
 Association of Arab and European Universities

References

1964 establishments in Jordan
Educational institutions established in 1964
Organisations based in Amman
International college and university associations and consortia
Arab League